The 1st Saeima was the parliament of Latvia from November 7, 1922 until November 2, 1925. It was the first Saeima to be elected after the Constitutional Assembly of Latvia had created the Constitution of Latvia and the Elections Law.
 
Social-Democrat Frīdrihs Vesmanis was Speaker of the Saeima until March 17, 1925 followed by Social Democrat Pauls Kalniņš.

The 1st Saeima gave confidence to the 1st cabinet of Zigfrīds Anna Meierovics (July 20, 1922 – January 26, 1923), cabinet of Jānis Pauļuks (January 27, 1923 – June 27, 1923), 2nd cabinet of Meierovics (28 June 1923 – 26 January 1924), cabinet of Voldemārs Zāmuēls (January 25, 1924 – December 17, 1924) and the 1st cabinet of Hugo Celmiņš (December 19, 1924 – December 23, 1925).

Elections and parties
1st Saeima elections were held on October 7–8, 1922 and 82,2% (800,840 people) of eligible voters participated. Due to the liberal Elections law, 20 parties were elected to the 100 seats, representing all the political and ethnic interest groups of Latvia. Of the 100 MPs, 84 were Latvians, 62 had a higher education, 22 had a secondary education, 7 had graduated from teacher training colleges and 9 had a primary education.
Latvian Social Democratic Workers' Party – 30 seats
Latvian Farmers’ Union – 17 seats
Union of Social Democrats – Mensheviks and Rural Workers – 7 seats
Democratic Centre and Independents Union - 6 seats
Latgalian Christian Peasant and Catholic Party – 6 seats
Committee of the German Baltic Parties – 6 seats
Non-Partisan National Center – 4 seats
Christian National Union – 4 seats
Latgalian Farmer-Labour Party - 4 seats
New Farmers' Union– 3 seats
United List of Russians – 2 seats
Agudas Israel – 2 seats
Jewish National Bloc– 2 seats
Latgalian People's Party – 1 seat
Latgalian Farmers Party – 1 seat
List of Lithuanians and Catholics – 1 seat
Old Believers Central Committee – 1 seat
Ceire Cion – 1 seat
Latvia’s Jewish socialdemocratic workers party Bund – 1 seat
United Polish Parties – 1 seat

List of Saeima deputies
First Saeima deputies list.

 Arturs Alberings
 Kristaps Bahmanis
 Viktors Barkāns
 Voldemārs Bastjānis
 Ernests Bauers
 Arveds Bergs
 Pēteris Berģis
 Ernests Birkhāns
 Alfrēds Birznieks
 Roberts Bīlmanis
 Aleksandrs Bočagovs
 Augusts Briedis
 Kristaps Bungšs
 Ansis Buševics
 Kārlis Būmeisters
 Hugo Celmiņš
 Jūlijs Celms
 Fēlikss Cielēns
 Jānis Čakste
 Kārlis Dēķens
 Morduhs Dubins
 Jānis Ducens
 Roberts Dukurs
 Antons Dzenis
 Kristaps Eliass
 Ernests Felsbergs
 Manfrēds Fēgezaks
 Vilhelms Firkss
 Leopolds Fišmanis
 Pauls Gailīts
 Jānis Goldmanis
 Eduards Grantskalns
 Teodors Grīnbergs
 Ernests Gulbis
 Kārlis Gulbis
 Jons Hāns
 Vilis Holcmanis
 Kārlis Irbe
 Roberts Ivanovs
 Eduards Jaunzems
 Staņislavs Jubuls
 Jānis Kalējs
 Meletijs Kallistratovs
 Ringolds Kalnings
 Arvīds Kalniņš
 Augusts Kalniņš
 Bruno Kalniņš
 Nikolajs Kalniņš
 Pauls Kalniņš
 Kārlis Kasparsons
 Karls Kellers
 Francis Kemps
 Ādolfs Klīve
 Egons Knops
 Pēteris Koreckis	
 Pēteris Kotans
 Bernards Kublinskis
 Alberts Kviesis
 Jēkabs Ķullīts
 Maksis Lazersons
 Pauls Lejiņš
 Rūdolfs Lindiņš
 Klāvs Lorencs
 Noijs Maizels
 Jānis Mazvērsīts
 Zigfrīds Meierovics
 Fricis Menders
 Ernests Morics
 Oto Nonācs
 Markus Nuroks
 Kārlis Ozoliņš
 Kārlis Pauļuks
 Andrejs Petrevics
 Jānis Purgalis
 Eduards Radziņš
 Rainis-Jānis Pliekšāns
 Jezups Rancāns
 Gustavs Reinhards
 Jezups Roskošs
 Miķelis Rozentāls
 Jezups Rubulis
 Vladislavs Rubulis
 Ansis Rudevics
 Jānis Rudzis
 Teofils Rudzītis
 Voldemārs Salnājs
 Hermanis Salnis
 Visvaldis Sanders
 Pēteris Siecenieks
 Andrejs Sīmanis
 Kārlis Skalbe
 Marģers Skujenieks
 Pauls Šīmanis
 Francis Trasuns
 Jezups Trasuns
 Kārlis Ulmanis
 Pēteris Ulpe
 Andrejs Veckalns
 Antons Velkme
 Jānis Veržbickis
 Fridrihs Vesmanis
 Jānis Vesmanis
 Jānis Višņa
 Ruvins Vitenbergs
 Pēteris Zeibolts
 Gustavs Zemgals

References

Political history of Latvia
Saeima